Bertelia is a genus of snout moths. It was described by William Barnes and James Halliday McDunnough in 1913.

Species
Bertelia dupla Blanchard, 1976
Bertelia grisella Barnes & McDunnough, 1913

References

Moth genera
Phycitinae